The Morganton Aggies were a minor league baseball team based in Morganton, North Carolina from 1948 to 1952. Morganton teams played exclusively as members of the Western Carolina League, winning the 1951 league pennant. The Aggies played home minor league games at Morganton High School Park.

History
Morganton, North Carolina first hosted league baseball play in 1948. The Morganton "Aggies" became charter members of the eight–team Class D level Western Carolina League. The Forest City Owls, Hendersonville Skylarks, Lenoir Red Sox, Lincolnton Cardinals, Marion Marauders, Newton-Conover Twins and Shelby Farmers joined Morganton as charter members.

Beginning play on April 30, 1948, the Morganton Aggies placed 3rd in league regular season play. Ending the regular season with a record of 54–53, playing under managers Les McGarity, Homer Daugherty, Wayne Stewart and Boger McGimsey, Morganton finished 13.5 games behind the 1st place Lincolnton Cardinals in the Western Carolina League regular season standings. In the 1948 playoffs, the Lincolnton Cardinals defeated Morganton 4 games to 2.

The Morganton Aggies placed 4th in the 1949 Western Carolina League regular season standings and reached the playoff Finals the eight–team league. The Aggies ended the season with a record of 58–49, playing under manager Sam Bell as the Wagonmakers finished 13.5 games behind the 1st place Newton-Conover Twins. In the playoffs, the Aggies defeated the Lincolnton Cardinals 4 games to 3 to advance. In the Western Carolina League Finals, the Rutherford County Owls defeated the Morganton Aggies 4 games to 1 to win the championship. Morganton's Boger McGimsey led the Western Carolina League with 118 RBI, while teammate Lelon Jaynes of Morganton led the league with 19 wins and 202 strikeouts.

In 1950, Morgantown placed 5th in the Western Carolina League final regular season standings. Managed by Sam Bell, Homer Daugherty and Jim Poole, Morganton ended the season with a record of 54–57 to finish 15.5 games behind the 1st place Newton-Conover Twins in the final regular standings. With their 5th place finish in the eight–team league, Morganton did not qualify for the playoffs.

The 1951 Morganton Aggies won the Western Carolina League pennant and reached the league Finals. Morganton finished with a regular season record of 71–39 to place 1st in the regular season standings, playing under manager George Bradshaw. Morganton finished 4.5 games ahead of the 2nd place Shelby Farmers. In the Western Carolina League playoffs,- Morganton defeated the Lincolnton Cardinals 4 games to 3 to advance. In the Finals, the Shelby Farmers defeated Morganton Aggies 4 games to 3 in the seven game series. Aggie Bordie Waddle led the league with 24 home runs. Pete Treece of Morganton led the league with 25 winds and 263 strikeouts.

The Morganton Aggies folded during the 1952 Western Carolina League season, as the league began the season reduced to six teams. On August 3, 1951, Morganton folded. The Aggies had a record of 41–51 playing under managers George Bradshaw and Pete Treece when the franchise permanently folded. The Western Carolina League completed the 1952 season with five teams. The Western Carolina League combined with the North Carolina State League to form the Tar Heel League in 1953 and 1954 before resuming play in 1960, without Morganton as a member.

Morganton, North Carolina has not hosted another minor league team.

From 2005 to 2013, Morganton hosted the "Morganton Aggies," who revived the moniker when the teams played summer collegiate baseball as members of the Southern Collegiate Baseball League.

The ballpark
The Morganton Aggies were noted to have played home minor league games at the Morganton High School Park. The ballpark site is still in use. The site currently houses the Burke County Public School Central office. The building is located at 510 South College Street in Morganton, North Carolina.

Timeline

Year-by-year records

Notable alumni

George Bradshaw (1951–1952, MGR)
Jim Poole  (1950, MGR)
Johnny Temple (1948) 6x MLB All-Star

See also
Morganton Aggies players

References

External links
Baseball Reference

Defunct minor league baseball teams
Defunct baseball teams in North Carolina
Baseball teams established in 1948
Baseball teams disestablished in 1952
Burke County, North Carolina
1948 establishments in North Carolina
1952 disestablishments in North Carolina